General Sinclair may refer to:

George Brian Sinclair (1928–2020), British Army major general
John Sinclair (British Army officer) (1897–1977), British Army major general
Patrick Sinclair (1736–1820), British Army lieutenant general
Santiago Sinclair (born 1927), Chilean Army general
Volodymyr Sinclair (1879—1946), Ukrainian People's Army major general

See also
William Sinclair-Burgess (1880–1964), New Zealand Military Forces major general
Ewen Sinclair-MacLagan (1868–1948), British Army major general